, better known as , is a Japanese kickboxer, fighting out of Japan. As of July 2021, he is the #7 ranked Bantamweight according to Combat Press. He's been ranked since May 2019.

Kickboxing career
Koji lost to Taiga by decision in June 2017.

In February 2017, Koji fought Mohamed Boulef for the ISKA World Lightweight title. He beat Boulef by unanimous decision.

He was scheduled to fight Kotaro Shimano in September 2017. Koji won the fight by unanimous decision.

Koji participated in the 2018 Super Featherweight Grand Prix. He beat Hirotaka Urabe by decision in the quarterfinals, and lost to Kosuke Komiyama in the semifinals by decision in turn.

He fought Stavros Exakoustidis in September 2018. Koji won the fight by split decision after an extra round was fought.

In December 2018 he fought Takeru Segawa for the K-1 Super Featherweight title. Takeru won the fight by unanimous decision.

Koji was scheduled to fight Jan Szajko during K'Festa 2. He beat Szajko by unanimous decision.

Kouzi fought Tatsuya Oiwa during K-1 World GP 2019: Japan vs World 5 vs 5. The fight went into an extra fourth round, after which Kouzi won a split decision.

He fought Seiya Kawahara during K-1's 2019 Yokohama Matsuri event. Seiya was dominant throughout the majority of the first round, before Koji dropped him seconds before the end of the end of the round. Koji would go on to win the fight, and was awarded Combat Press' "Comeback of the Year".

Rizin FF
Koji was under exclusive contract with K-1, but he opted to pay contractual penalties in order to sign with Rizin FF. In his promotional debut Koji fought Tenshin Nasukawa during Rizin 24 - Saitama. Tenshin won the fight by unanimous decision. Koji was next scheduled to fight Takanori Gomi in a special rules bout, at Rizin 26. Gomi's weight limit was 75 kg and Koji's 65 kg. The rules of the bout forbid grappling and kicking, while both fighters wore 12oz gloves. Koji lost the bout via majority decision.

Koji faced Genji Umeno in the semifinal bout of a four-man kickboxing tournament, held during the Rizin 29 – Osaka event. The idea for the kickboxing Grand Prix came from Kouzi, wanting RIZIN to concentrate more on kickboxing. Going into the Grand Prix, Kouzi believed he will have a good showing saying, "This will be the ultimate public masturbation for me that only I can make happen." 43 seconds into his fight with Umeno, there was an inadvertent clash of heads which left Umeno unable to continue fighting. Accordingly, Koji advanced to the finals, where he met Taiju Shiratori. Shiratori won the final bout by unanimous decision. Koji was later hospitalized with a fractured fundus, which required surgery. He successfully underwent surgery on July 2, 2021.

Koji faced Kazuma Sone at Rizin 32 - Okinawa on November 20, 2021. He won the bout via unanimous decision.

Koji faced  YA-MAN at Rizin 33 - Saitama on December 31, 2021. He lost the fight by majority decision.

Koji was booked to face Genji Umeno in a rematch at Rizin 34 – Osaka on March 20, 2022. He won the fight by majority decision.

Titles and accomplishments
International Sport Kickboxing Association
 2017 ISKA K-1 World Lightweight Champion

HEAT
 2013 HEAT Kick Lightweight Champion

TRIBELATE
 2012 TRIBELATE Kick Super Featherweight Champion
Awards
CombatPress.com
 2019 Comeback of the Year

Professional kickboxing record

|-  style="background:#"
| 2023-04-01 || ||align=left| Ryusei Ashizawa || Rizin 41 – Osaka || Osaka, Japan || ||  ||
|- style="background:#cfc;"
| 2022-05-07 || Win || align="left" | Daowsakon Mor.Tassanai || HEAT 50 || Nagoya, Japan|| Decision (Overturned) || 4 || 3:00 
|-  style="background:#cfc;"
| 2022-03-20|| Win || align=left| Genji Umeno || Rizin 34 – Osaka || Tokyo, Japan || Decision (Majority) || 3 || 3:00
|-  style="background:#fbb"
| 2021-12-31|| Loss ||align=left|  YA-MAN || Rizin 33 - Saitama || Saitama, Japan || Decision (Majority)||3  ||3:00
|-  style="background:#cfc"
| 2021-11-20|| Win ||align=left| Kazuma Sone || Rizin 32 - Okinawa || Okinawa, Japan || Decision (Unanimous) ||  3 ||3:00  
|-  style="background:#fbb;"
| 2021-06-27|| Loss ||align=left| Taiju Shiratori || Rizin 29 – Osaka, Tournament Final || Osaka, Japan ||Decision (Unanimous) || 3 || 3:00
|-  style="background:#c5d2ea;"
| 2021-06-27|| No Contest ||align=left| Genji Umeno || Rizin 29 – Osaka, Tournament Semifinal || Osaka, Japan || Doctor Stoppage (Head clash) || 1 || 0:43
|-
! style=background:white colspan=9 |
|-  style="background:#fbb;"
| 2020-09-27|| Loss||align=left| Tenshin Nasukawa || Rizin 24 - Saitama || Saitama, Japan || Decision (Unanimous) || 3 || 3:00
|-  style="background:#cfc;"
| 2019-11-24 || Win|| align=left| Seiya Kawahara|| K-1 WORLD GP 2019 JAPAN Yokohama Matsuri || Yokohama, Japan ||KO (Punches) || 2 || 2:59
|- style="background:#cfc;"
| 2019-08-24|| Win ||align=left| Tatsuya Oiwa || K-1 World GP 2019: Japan vs World 5 vs 5 & Special Superfight in Osaka || Osaka, Japan || Ext.R Decision (Split) || 4 || 3:00
|-style="background:#cfc;"
| 2019-03-10|| Win || align=left| Jan Szajko ||K-1 World GP 2019: K’FESTA 2 || Saitama, Japan ||  Decision (Unanimous) || 3 || 3:00
|-  style="background:#FFBBBB;"
| 2018-12-08|| Loss || align=left| Takeru || K-1 World GP 2018: K-1 Lightweight World's Strongest Tournament || Osaka, Japan ||  Decision (Unanimous) || 3 || 3:00
|-
! style=background:white colspan=9 |
|-  style="background:#cfc;"
| 2018-09-24 || Win || align=left| Stavros Exakoustidis || K-1 World GP 2018: inaugural Cruiserweight Championship Tournament || Saitama, Japan || Ext.R Decision (Split) || 4 || 3:00
|-  style="background:#FFBBBB;"
| 2018-03-21|| Loss ||align=left| Kosuke Komiyama || K-1 World GP 2018: K'FESTA.1 -60kg World Tournament Semi Finals || Saitama, Japan || Decision (Unanimous)|| 3 || 3:00
|-  style="background:#cfc;"
| 2018-03-21|| Win ||align=left| Hirotaka Urabe || K-1 World GP 2018: K'FESTA.1 -60kg World Tournament Quarter Finals || Saitama, Japan || Ext.R Decision (Unanimous) || 4 || 3:00
|-  style="background:#cfc;"
| 2017-09-18|| Win ||align=left| Kotaro Shimano || K-1 World GP 2016 -60kg World Tournament || Tokyo, Japan|| Decision (Unanimous) || 3 || 3:00
|-  style="background:#FFBBBB;"
| 2017-06-18|| Loss ||align=left| Taiga ||K-1 World GP 2017 Super Welterweight Championship Tournament || Tokyo, Japan|| Decision (Unanimous) || 3 || 3:00
|-  style="background:#cfc;"
| 2017-02-19|| Win ||align=left| Mohamed Boulef || HEAT 39 || Nagoya, Japan|| Decision (Unanimous)|| 5 || 3:00
|-
! style=background:white colspan=9 |
|-  style="background:#cfc;"
| 2016-09-19|| Win ||align=left| Toshi || K-1 World GP 2016 -60kg World Tournament || Tokyo, Japan|| Decision (Unanimous) || 3 || 3:00
|-  style="background:#FFBBBB;"
| 2016-04-24|| Loss ||align=left| Koya Urabe || K-1 World GP 2016 -60kg Japan Tournament, Quarter Finals || Tokyo, Japan|| Decision (Unanimous) || 3 || 3:00
|-  style="background:#CCFFCC;"
| 2016-02-05 || Win ||align=left| Syun Kentoshi || Krush.63  || Nagoya, Japan|| KO (Left High Kick)|| 2 || 1:26
|-  style="background:#CCFFCC;"
| 2015-11-29 || Win ||align=left| Jo Seong-hyeon || HEAT 36 || Nagoya, Japan|| TKO (3 Knockdowns)|| 3 || 2:30
|-
! style=background:white colspan=9 |
|-  style="background:#FFBBBB;"
| 2015-09-27 || Loss ||align=left| Yuya || NJKF 2015 6th || Tokyo, Japan|| Decision (Unanimous)|| 5 || 3:00
|-
! style=background:white colspan=9 |
|-  style="background:#FFBBBB;"
| 2015-06-07 || Loss ||align=left| Fukashi || Bigbang 21 || Tokyo, Japan|| Decision (Majority)|| 3 || 3:00
|-
! style=background:white colspan=9 |
|-  style="background:#CCFFCC;"
| 2014-12-21 || Win ||align=left| Kim Jin Hyeok || HEAT 34 || Kobe, Japan|| Decision (Majority) || 5 || 3:00
|-
! style=background:white colspan=9 |
|-  style="background:#FFBBBB;"
| 2014-07-25 || Loss ||align=left| SHIGERU|| RISE cooperation REBELS.28 || Tokyo, Japan|| Decision (Unanimous) || 3 || 3:00
|-  style="background:#CCFFCC;"
| 2014-02-23 || Win ||align=left| Guo Chen || HEAT 30 || Kobe, Japan|| KO (Left Hook to the Body)|| 2 || 2:56
|-  style="background:#CCFFCC;"
| 2013-12-15 || Win ||align=left| Yuya || HEAT 29, Heat Kick 1 Day Lightweight Tournament, Final || Tokyo, Japan|| Ext.R Decision (Unanimous)|| 4 || 3:00
|-
! style=background:white colspan=9 |
|-  style="background:#CCFFCC;"
| 2013-12-15 || Win ||align=left| Kouki || HEAT 29, Heat Kick 1 Day Lightweight Tournament, Semi Finals || Tokyo, Japan|| Ext.R TKO || 4 || 1:55
|-  style="background:#CCFFCC;"
| 2013-10-13 || Win ||align=left| Jian Yon Ho || SFK～7th anniversary～ ×REBELS -SPIRIT FIRE KOBE- || Osaka, Japan|| TKO (Left hook to the body) || 2 || 1:28
|-  style="background:#FFBBBB;"
| 2013-07-21 || Loss ||align=left| Hikaru Machida || REBELS.18, 60kg Championship Tournament Semi Finals || Tokyo, Japan|| Decision (Majority) || 3 || 3:00
|-  style="background:#CCFFCC;"
| 2013-03-10 || Win ||align=left| TASUKU || Road to GLORY JAPAN || Tokyo, Japan|| Decision (Unanimous)|| 3 || 3:00
|-  style="background:#FFBBBB;"
| 2013-01-26 || Loss ||align=left| Shota Kanbe || Krush.26, -58kg Tournament Quarter Finals || Tokyo, Japan|| Decision (Majority) || 3 || 3:00
|-  style="background:#FFBBBB;"
| 2012-12-09 || Loss ||align=left| Hisaaki Nakamukai || J-NETWORK J-NEXUS 2012 ～Kette ii Tomo!～ || Tokyo, Japan|| Decision || 3 || 3:00
|-  style="background:#FFBBBB;"
| 2012-08-26 || Loss ||align=left| Taison Maeguchi || J-KICK 2012～NEXT J-GENERATION～4th || Tokyo, Japan|| Ext.R Decision (Split) || 4 || 3:00
|-  style="background:#CCFFCC;"
| 2012-07-14 || Win ||align=left| Tsuyoshi Nakashima || Krush-EX 2012 vol.4 || Tokyo, Japan|| Decision || 3 || 3:00
|-  style="background:#CCFFCC;"
| 2012-04-28 || Win ||align=left| Ryoma Hasumi || TRIBELATE vol.36～Title Match Festival～ || Tokyo, Japan|| Decision (Unanimous) || 3 || 3:00
|-
! style=background:white colspan=9 |
|-  style="background:#CCFFCC;"
| 2012-04-01 || Win ||align=left| Motohiro Shinohara || J-NETWORK J-FIGHT in SHINJUKU ～vol.25 || Tokyo, Japan|| KO || 2 || 1:33
|-  style="background:#CCFFCC;"
| 2011-11-27 || Win ||align=left| Reiou || J-NETWORK J-F-X ～TIME to CHANGE the KICK by J-SPIRIT EX.～ || Tokyo, Japan|| TKO || 1 || 1:49
|-  style="background:#FFBBBB;"
| 2011-10-10 || Loss ||align=left| Shoudai Kitazono || KING OF STRIKERS Round 6 || Fukuoka, Japan|| KO || 3 ||
|-  style="background:#FFBBBB;"
| 2011-09-18 || Loss ||align=left| Ryuji Washio || J-NETWORK J-FIGHT in SHINJUKU～vol.23～ || Tokyo, Japan|| Decision (Unanimous)|| 3 || 3:00
|-  style="background:#CCFFCC;"
| 2011-07-18 || Win ||align=left| Koki Ota || DEMOLITION 2 DAYS ～day 2nd Kick Boxing～ – HIGH SPEED – || Osaka, Japan|| KO (Right Cross) || 2 || 2:35
|-  style="background:#CCFFCC;"
| 2010-12-12 || Win ||align=left| Shohei Nishimura || DEEP☆KICK 5 || Osaka, Japan|| KO || 2 || 2:05
|-  style="background:#CCFFCC;"
| 2010-08-08 || Win ||align=left| Yuto Tsujide || DEEP☆KICK 4 || Osaka, Japan|| Decision (Unanimous) || 3 || 3:00
|-  style="background:#FFBBBB;"
| 2010-06-13 || Loss ||align=left| Ken Saenchaigym || NJKF BANZAI ATTACK I  || Tokyo, Japan|| Decision || 3 || 3:00
|-  style="background:#FFBBBB;"
| 2010-04-04 || Loss ||align=left| Yuki Kyotani || DEEP☆KICK 3 || Osaka, Japan|| Decision (Unanimous) || 3 || 3:00
|-  style="background:#CCFFCC;"
| 2009-12-23 || Win ||align=left| Ichiji Minami || Yuichiro Nagashima produce DEEP KICK 2 || Osaka, Japan|| Decision (Split) || 3 || 3:00
|-  style="background:#CCFFCC;"
| 2009-10-11 || Win ||align=left| Takashi Fujita || NAGOYA KICK～BoogieFight09 VACANCY～ || Osaka, Japan|| Decision (Unanimous)|| 3 || 3:00
|-  style="background:#CCFFCC;"
| 2009-07-05 || Win ||align=left| Takeshi Kai || Yuichiro Nagashima produce DEEP KICK || Osaka, Japan|| Decision (Unanimous) || 3 || 3:00
|-  style="background:#c5d2ea;"
| 2009-05-10 || Draw ||align=left| Daiki Kato || NAGOYA KICK～BoogieFight08 Sandcastle～ || Aichi, Japan|| Decision || 3 || 3:00
|-  style="background:#c5d2ea;"
| 2009-03-08 || Draw ||align=left| Akitaka Sugiyama || NAGOYAKICK～BoogieFight07 Black Sunday～ || Aichi, Japan|| Decision || 3 || 3:00
|-  style="background:#CCFFCC;"
| || Win ||align=left| Fujita || S-1 || Japan|| KO ||  ||
|-
| colspan=9 | Legend:

Exhibition Boxing Record

See also
 List of male kickboxers

References

Living people
1989 births
Japanese male kickboxers
Flyweight kickboxers
Sportspeople from Osaka